Education group "Zrinski" is a unique organisation consisting of:
Economic School "Katarina Zrinski"
University College of Economics, Entrepreneurship and Management "Nikola Subic Zrinski"
Open University "Petar Zrinski"

Economic School Katarina Zrinski
Economic school Katarina Zrinski, NCEE Partner School, is a private Secondary school that educates young people for successful integration in the business world.

See also
List of institutions of higher education in Croatia

References
Official website

Universities and colleges in Croatia